The Chrobry fortified village (Polish: Gród Chrobry, German: Wallburg Chrobry) is an archaeological earthwork and a historical monument near Szprotawa, in the Polish southwestern province of Lower Silesia. It is one of the largest of its kind in Poland and was named after the country's first crowned ruler, Bolesław I the Brave (in Polish known as Chrobry).

Background
The surface of the polygon is flat throughout, and has regular, steep inclined edges. The site lies between a bog and a marsh, which are now both partly dried out.

Prior to 1945 the site was known as the 'Nun Bush Hill'. 

The date of the original structure is as yet unknown. German historian August Gloger (1927) described the site as dating from the times these lands were still Polish, but without providing particulars. Recently, Maciej Boryna, from the local historical museum Muzeum Ziemi Szprotawskiej, identified ceramic fragments from the site as Medieval, concluding that the structure was never completed or was only inhabited briefly.

As of 30 May 2007, thanks to the efforts of the local historical society Towarzystwo Bory Dolnośląskie, the site is now protected as a place of designated historical importance. Other, smaller archaeological earthworks can be found nearby.

References 
 August Gloger: Beiträge zur Heimatkunde des Kreises Sprottau, 2nd edition, 1925
 Maciej Boryna: Szprotawa i okolice, 2nd edition, 2004
 Maciej Boryna: Gminna Ewidencja Zabytków Gminy Szprotawa, pos. nr. 49/2475, 2005

External links
 A medieval fort discovered in Szprotawa

Archaeological sites in Poland
History of Silesia
Former populated places in Poland
Żagań County
Buildings and structures in Lubusz Voivodeship